Kelley Racing is a former Indy Racing League team founded by Fort Wayne, Indiana-based car dealer Tom Kelley that fielded a Delphi sponsored car for Scott Sharp during its entire existence from 1998 to 2004. The team was based in Indianapolis and captured 9 wins (7 with Sharp, 1 with Mark Dismore, and 1 with Al Unser Jr.) before shutting down when Sharp decided to leave the team with his sponsorship after a poor 2004 season. The assets of the team were bought by Tony George, who transformed it into Vision Racing.

Former drivers
All drivers were  American.

Mark Dismore (1997-2001)
Sarah Fisher (2004)
Tony Renna (2002-2003)
Scott Sharp (1998-2004)
Al Unser Jr. (2002-2003)

Complete IRL IndyCar Series results
(key) (Results in bold indicate pole position; results in italics indicate fastest lap)

 The 1999 VisionAire 500K at Charlotte was cancelled after 79 laps due to spectator fatalities.

IndyCar wins

IndyCar Series teams
American auto racing teams
Indy Lights teams